Techtro Lucknow Football Club is an Indian professional football club based in Lucknow, Uttar Pradesh. The club competes in the Lucknow Super Division. The club was established in 2019 by Neeraj Kholiya. Techtro Lucknow FC are the current champions of Lucknow Super Division, and nominated for I-League 2nd Division.

History 
Techtro Lucknow FC was formed in 2019 as Techtro FC by Neeraj Kholiya,  and renamed as Techtro Lucknow FC in 2021. After forming of Techtro Swades United FC, it became satellite team of their academy players, before getting I-League 2nd Division nomination as separated entity.

Honours

Domestic league 
 Lucknow Super Division
 Champions (1): 2021

Domestic cups 
Late Subhash Mishra Super Sports Cup
Champions (1): 2022
Hazi Shakoor Khan Memorial Football Tournament
Runners-up (1): 2022
Mansarovar Cup
Champion (1): 2021
SSS Republic Day Cup
Champion (1): 2021

References 

Football in Uttar Pradesh
Association football clubs established in 2019
2019 establishments in Uttar Pradesh